Larissa was a town in the borderlands of ancient Elis and ancient Achaea. According to a fragment of Theopompus, cited by Strabo, it was on the road between Elis and Dyme. It is related to the Larissos River, which served as the border between Elis and Achaea and next to which was found a temple of Athena Larisea. It is doubtful whether Xenophon wants to refer to the city or the river, by mentioning 'κατὰ Λάρισσαν' as the place where the Spartan king Agis II entered Elis from Achaea.

References

Populated places in ancient Elis
Populated places in ancient Achaea
Former populated places in Greece
Lost ancient cities and towns